Christina Lake Provincial Park is a provincial park in British Columbia, Canada. The lake it's on, Christina Lake, is renowned as the warmest lake in Canada.

See also
 Christina Lake (British Columbia) - lake
 Christina Lake, British Columbia - community

References

External links

Provincial parks of British Columbia
Boundary Country
1971 establishments in British Columbia